4 Days in Sing Sing is the twelfth studio album by Australian rock band The Black Sorrows. The album was recorded in four days in Sing Sing Studios in Melbourne, where the Black Sorrows recorded their albums Hold On to Me and Harley & Rose and released as a CD/DVD package in September 2009.

Lead singer Joe Camilleri said; "This all started because I was asked to document the past for a live DVD. I love and embrace my past, but I know and believe that The Black Sorrows will never be a heritage act because for us there’s no finish line. The heart and soul of The Sorrows still beats loud and clear." The plan was to recorded each track in no more than three takes to keep the music 'fresh' and 'not overwork it'.
The DVD documents the recording of the album and includes interview footage of the band, sneak peaks behind the scenes and diary notes of the process by Camilleri.

Track listing 
 CD track listing (HEAD109)
 "Best Thing" - 3:27
 "What Levi Wants" - 4:06	
 "Lonesome Road" - 4:52	
 "Lean On Me" - 3:57	
 "Don't Judge Me Too Hard" - 4:23	
 "Lay By My Side" - 4:00
 "Comfort Me" - 3:15
 "Every Natural Thing" -3:27	
 "Midnight Rain" - 4:49
 "The Raven" - 4:17
 "Sometimes I Wish" - 3:16
 "Where's it All Gonna End" - 3:12	
 "Better Times" - 5:44
 "Such a Night" - 5:24	
 "Little Murders" - 4:08 	
 "Viva La Money" - 3:21
 "Sumo" - 13:02

 DVD track listing
 "Don't Judge Me Too Hard"	
 "Comfort Me" 	
 "Lean On Me" 	
 "What Levi Wants" 	
 "Lonesome Road" 
 "Lay By My Side" 	
 "Such a Night"	
 "Sumo" 	
 "Where's it All Gonna End" 	
 "Every Natural Thing" 	
 "The Raven" 
 "The Best Thing" 	
 "Better Times" 	
 "Don't Judge Me Too Hard"  (Film Clip)  
 "Sometimes I Wish" 	
 "Midnight Rain" 	
 "Little Murders" 	
 "Viva La Money"

Personnel
Musicians: 
 Joe Camilleri - vocals, saxophone, guitar, harmonica, melodica
 James Black - piano, Hammond organ, guitar
 Claude Carranza - guitar, vocals
 Joe Creighton - bass guitar, vocals
 Tony Floyd - drums, vocals
 Alejandro Vega - percussion
 Jordan Murray - trombone 
 Dave Newdick - trumpet 
 Tim Wilson - saxophone

References

External links
 "4 Days in Sing Sing" at discogs.com

2009 albums
The Black Sorrows albums
Albums produced by Joe Camilleri